The NZ Merchant Service Guild Industrial Union of Workers (NZMSG) is a trade union in New Zealand. It represents workers in seagoing ships, as well as the waterfront/ports/shore-based shipping industry, and the passenger/tourism industry.

The NZMSG has 1000 members and is affiliated with the New Zealand Council of Trade Unions and the International Transport Workers' Federation.

External links
 

New Zealand Council of Trade Unions
International Transport Workers' Federation
Maritime officers' trade unions